The 2012 Chicago Red Stars season is the fourth season of the soccer club; the season it competed was the only season of the Women's Premier Soccer League Elite.

Major events
After the end of the 2011 season the Red Stars and other WPSL and former WPS teams formed a more professional league the WPSL Elite, the other teams included:

Squad

First-team squad

Squad correct as of July 20, 2012

Second squad

Transfers

In

Out

Regular-season standings

Results summary

Matches

WPSLE regular season

Source: WPSLElite.com Schedule

WPSLE playoffs

US Women Open Cup

Squad statistics

Top scorers
Includes all competitive matches. The list is sorted by shirt number when total goals are equal.

Last updated: 28 July 2012
Source: WPSL.com 2012 Goals

Top assists
Includes all competitive matches. The list is sorted by shirt number when total goals are equal.

Last updated: 28 July 2012
Source: WPSL.com 2012 Assists

Team management

Last updated: 27 July 2012
Source: WPSL Elite Chicago Red Stars

Stadium

Last updated: 27 July 2012
Source: WPSL Elite Chicago Red Stars

Team awards

Notes
Details about the first four matches played in the U.S. Women's Open Cup are sparse with the articles reporting only that Shayla Mutz had 3 goals and an assist and Allison Doyle had two goals and an assist.

References

American soccer clubs 2012 season
2012
2012 Women's Professional Soccer season
2012 in sports in Illinois